The canton of Domont is an administrative division of the Val-d'Oise department, Île-de-France region, northern France. Its borders were modified at the French canton reorganisation which came into effect in March 2015. Its seat is in Domont.

It consists of the following communes:

Baillet-en-France
Béthemont-la-Forêt
Bouffémont
Chauvry
Domont
Moisselles
Montsoult
Piscop
Le Plessis-Bouchard
Saint-Leu-la-Forêt
Saint-Prix

References

Cantons of Val-d'Oise